The 1988 Chicago Bears season was their 69th regular season and 19th postseason completed in the National Football League. This season marked the first time since 1974 that Walter Payton was not on the Bears' opening day roster. The Bears looked to improve on an 11–4 finish that won them the NFC Central Division but ended abruptly when they were eliminated for the second consecutive year by the Washington Redskins. 

The Bears won 12 games and lost 4, tying for the best record in the league with the Buffalo Bills and the AFC Champion Cincinnati Bengals. They earned home field advantage in the NFC. However, the Bears failed to advance to the Super Bowl XXIII as one of the top two seeds for a third straight season, falling to the eventual Super Bowl champion San Francisco 49ers in the NFC Championship Game at Soldier Field. This was the second time that the 49ers and Bears had met for a trip to the Super Bowl during the decade, with the 49ers previously defeating the Bears in the 1984 NFC Championship Game on their way to Super Bowl XIX.

Coach Mike Ditka suffered a heart attack during the season, but was back on the sidelines 11 days later. Ditka was named coach of the year for the second time in his career. 1988 also marked Jim McMahon's last season as starter for the Bears, as he was traded during the following offseason to the San Diego Chargers.

1988 Chicago Bears draft choices

Roster 
1988 Team Starters

Offense

 9 Jim McMahon QB
 35 Neal Anderson RB
 26 Matt Suhey FB
 85 Dennis McKinnon WR/PR
 29 Dennis Gentry WR/KR
 80 James Thornton TE
 73 John Wojciechowski LT
 62 Mark Bortz LG
 63 Jay Hilgenberg C
 57 Tom Thayer RG
 78 Keith Van Horne RT

Defense

 90 Al Harris LDE
 76 Steve McMichael LDT
 99 Dan Hampton RDT
 95 Richard Dent RDE
 59 Ron Rivera LB
 50 Mike Singletary LB
 51 Jim Morrissey LB
 27 Mike Richardson LCB
 24 Vestee Jackson RCB
 22 Dave Duerson SS
 37 Maurice Douglass FS
 6 Kevin Butler K
 15 Bryan Wagner P

Final roster

Regular season

Schedule

Game summaries

Week 1

Week 4

Week 13

Standings

Playoffs 
In the divisional playoffs, the Bears defeated the Philadelphia Eagles in the Fog Bowl, earning their first postseason victory since Super Bowl XX. A week later, Chicago was routed 28–3 by the San Francisco 49ers. This was the Bears' last appearance in the NFC Championship Game until 2006.

Divisional

NFC Championship

Awards and records

References 

 Chicago Bears on Pro Football Reference
 Chicago Bears on jt-sw.com
 1988 Bears at Bearshistory.com

External links 

 1988 Chicago Bears Season at www.bearshistory.com

NFC Central championship seasons
Chicago Bears
Chicago Bears seasons
Chicago